Oppelia is a haploceratoid ammonite and type genus for the Oppeliidae that lived during the Middle Jurassic.  Shells of Oppelia are involute with a small to moderate size umbilicus, bluntly rounded to sharp venter, and deeply impressed dorsum.  Sides are generally smooth but may be variously ribbed on the outer flanks.  Similar and related genera include Oxycerites and Oecotraustes.

Distribution
Jurassic of Germany, Greenland, India, Italy, Madagascar, Mexico, Poland, Spain and the United Kingdom

References

Ammonitida genera
Oppeliidae
Jurassic ammonites
Ammonites of Europe